The women's +78 kg judo competitions at the 2022 Commonwealth Games in Birmingham, England took place on August 2 at the Coventry Arena. A total of 10 competitors from 10 nations took part.

Results 
The draw is as follows:

Repechages

References

External links
 
 Results
 

W79
2022
Commonwealth W79